Ramon d'Ortafà was a 15th-century Spanish Catalan noble, originally of Perpignan. 

In 1452 he became viceroy of King Alphonse V of the Kingdom of Naples in Albania. His task was to ensure the safety of Krujë, to capture as much territory as possible from Muslim "infidels" and to protect Catholicism among local population because it was endangered by the Islamisation of the population of Albania. 

To accomplish his task, d’Ortafà appointed Pere Escuder as castellan of Krujë castle instead of Joan de Castro. He organized reconstruction of the fortifications of Krujë castle, which was in poor condition, and also fortified some other positions suitable for organization of the resistance against the Ottoman advances, including Cape Rodoni. Alphonso V sent wheat, wine and a contingent of soldiers to support d’Ortafà. 

To ensure loyalty of the local population of Krujë, d’Ortafà promised them not only to protect their city from the Ottoman incursions but also to expand its borders by capturing nearby Muslim populated territories. D’Ortafà gave a brocade to Skanderbeg.

References

15th-century Aragonese nobility
15th-century rulers in Europe
Medieval Albania
Ottoman Albania